Hans Krause-Wichmann (28 August 1925 – 22 June 2007) was a German rower. He competed in the men's coxless four event at the 1952 Summer Olympics, representing Saar.

References

External links
 

1925 births
2007 deaths
German male rowers
Olympic rowers of Saar
Rowers at the 1952 Summer Olympics
Sportspeople from Karlsruhe